Tibet Area may refer to:
 Tibet, an ethno-cultural region in Asia
 The Tibetan Plateau, a geographical region in Asia
 The Tibet Area (administrative division), a former administrative area of the Republic of China and the People's Republic of China
 The Tibet Autonomous Region of the People's Republic of China

See also
 Tibet (disambiguation)

Tibet